42nd London Film Critics' Circle Awards
6 February 2022

Film of the Year:
The Power of the Dog

British/Irish Film of the Year:
The Souvenir Part II

The 42nd London Film Critics' Circle Awards honoured the best in film of 2021, as chosen by the London Film Critics' Circle. The ceremony was held on 6 February 2022 at The May Fair Hotel in London. The nominations were announced on 16 December 2021 by actors Gwilym Lee and Joanna Vanderham.

Winners and nominees

Winners will be listed first and highlighted with boldface.

References

External links
 Official site

2
2021 film awards
2021 in British cinema
2022 in London
February 2022 events in the United Kingdom
2021 awards in the United Kingdom